John Capouya (born March 27, 1956) is an author and  professor of journalism and non-fiction writing at the University of Tampa in Tampa, Florida. During his career in journalism he worked at Newsweek, The New York Times, SmartMoney, and New York Newsday. He wrote the books Florida Blues, Gorgeous George, and Real Men Do Yoga. He has also written for various publications, including Sports Illustrated, Life, Tampa Bay Times, and Travel & Leisure. Capouya is married to Suzanne Williamson, an artist and photographer. They split their time between Tampa and New York City and have been contributed together to Panhandler Magazine.

Capouya graduated with B.A. degrees in English and French from Grinnell College in 1978. He received an M.S. from Columbia University in 1981.

Capouya's book Florida Soul delves into Floridiaj Blues musicians and their stories. Featured artists include Timmy Thomas. Capouya notes that there is not a recognizable commonality across Florida soul music but that distinctive traits include Latin musical influences on Miami musicians such as K.C. & the Sunshine Band, a musical school for the blind where Ray Charles studied and in turn helped other aspiring musicians, and Florida A&M's marching band. He also discusses Deep City Records, an African American owned label out of the Liberty City neighborhood in Miami.

Capouya explores the influence Gorgeous George had on pop culture and other pop culture figures in his book on the flamboyant wrestler.

Bibliography
Florida Soul: From Ray Charles to KC and the Sunshine Band
Gorgeous George: The Outrageous Bad-Boy Wrestler Who Created American Pop Culture
Real Men Do Yoga: 21 Star Athletes Reveal Their Secrets for Strength, Flexibility and Peak Performance

References

External links
John Capouya's website
2017 MFA Residency presentation
Floeida Writer Project Podcast interview February 2019
Q&A with John Capouya University of Oregon

1956 births
Living people
Grinnell College alumni
Columbia University alumni
The New York Times writers
Newsday people
Life (magazine) photojournalists
Newsweek people
Sports Illustrated photojournalists
Tampa Bay Times
University of Tampa faculty